Paul Reulet (born 14 January 1994) is a French professional footballer who most recently played as a goalkeeper for Caen.

Reulet is a youth international for France.

References

External links
 

1994 births
Living people
Footballers from Caen
Association football goalkeepers
French footballers
France youth international footballers
Stade Malherbe Caen players
US Boulogne players
Ligue 1 players
Championnat National players